Justin Paul Jeffre (born February 25, 1973) is an American pop singer and politician. A long-time resident and vocal supporter of Cincinnati, Jeffre is probably best known as a member and bass singer of the multi-platinum-selling boy band 98 Degrees. The group thrived in the era of boy bands, including Boyz II Men, Backstreet Boys and 'N Sync. After releasing several popular albums in the late '90s and early 2000s, including their self-titled debut album, which was released in 1997 and went gold, and their multi-platinum album 98 Degrees and Rising, the boy band went on an extended hiatus. Jeffre has stayed out of the public eye for several years, instead focusing his attention on politics and activism.

Early life
Justin Jeffre was born on February 25, 1973, in Mount Clemens, Michigan, to Sue and Dan Jeffrey. He has a brother named Dan. Jeffre attended the School for Creative and Performing Arts in Cincinnati, where he met future bandmate Nick Lachey. The two sang together at SCPA before becoming professionals, making up part of a barbershop quartet.

Career

Before achieving fame, Jeffre was a student at the School for Creative and Performing Arts in Cincinnati. It was there that he first became friends with Nick Lachey. The two would later team up with Drew Lachey and Jeff Timmons to form 98 Degrees. The group was signed to Motown Records and soon began burning up the charts with hits like Invisible Man, Because of You, Hardest Thing, and Una Noche. 

98 Degrees eventually took a break, and Jeffre began to pursue a political career. He was a 2015 mayoral candidate for the city of Cincinnati. Though he did not gain election, he did succeed in bringing attention to Cincinnati. Jeffre continues to be an activist on various projects.

Discography

98 Degrees 
 98° (1997)
 98° and Rising (1998)
 Revelation (2000)
 2.0 (2013)

References

Singers from Ohio
People from Mount Clemens, Michigan
Politicians from Cincinnati
Living people
1973 births
20th-century American singers
21st-century American singers
98 Degrees members
American basses